Burch High School (BHS) was a public high school in Delbarton, West Virginia. It was closed in June 2011.

History
In 1916, under the leadership of Lee District board members James A. Farley, Bill Maynard, John Pinson, District Supervisor Lacy Chapman, and Superintendent of Schools Sam Curry, the plan for a new high school was started.

In the fall of 1918, Frank Totten and Claude Dove, principals of the Rock House and Upper Elk schools respectively, were brought to Mingo County to organize the new school. These two principals organized a third-class high school in 1919 at Rock House. In the fall of that year, they moved the new Rock House High School to Upper Elk with Claude Dove as principal. After moving, Rock House High School was promoted to a second-class high school.

In the fall of 1921, Rock House High School moved back to Rock House as a first-class high school and the school's name was changed to Burch High School.

The first graduating class, in 1922, comprised twenty-one students. Of this 1922 class, two became attorneys, five went on to become doctors, and twelve became teachers. James Bertram "Bert" Curry (1901–2004), the valedictorian of the class, became a very successful carpenter, and lived to the grand age of 103 years.

First Graduating Class
 Valedictorian - James Bertram "Bert" Curry, Carpenter
 Beatrice Spears, Attorney
 Matilla Spears, Attorney
 Roy Curry, DDS
 William Wirt Curry, DDS
 Carl Dove, DDS
 James Robert Farley, DDS
 Sam Farley, DDS
 Lace Chapman, Teacher
 Tilda Curry Chafin, Teacher
 Averel Clark, Teacher
 Ethel Clark, Teacher
 Lula Curry, Teacher
 Cecil Evans, Teacher
 Mary Evans, Teacher
 Sallie Farley Gates, Teacher
 Elizabeth Perdue, Teacher
 Ida Roach, Teacher
 Ida Scott, Teacher
 Frank Totten, Teacher

Burch High School shared its halls and classrooms with Burch Junior High for many years. In June 1987, Burch High School and Burch Junior High School separated.  Burch Junior High remained in the same building while Burch High School moved to a new facility adjacent to the existing Mingo County Vocational School in Airport Bottom, approximately 3 miles south on Route 52. The BHS class of 1987 was the last class to graduate from the old school while the class of 1988 was the first to graduate from the new Burch High School, after starting off the year at the old building.

In June 2011, Burch High School closed its doors for the last time. The 90-year-old school was consolidated with Gilbert, Matewan, and Williamson high schools to form Mingo Central High School, which opened in August 2011. The new school sits at an elevation of 1,940 feet on a 90 acre site along the King Coal Highway in Delbarton, WV (approx. 7 miles southeast of Delbarton).

Principals
 Claude Dove
 O. C. Van Camp
 R. E. Remish
 H. D. Fleming
 Marion D. West
 W. A. Collawn
 Troy Floyd
 Wayne B. Curry
 Henry C. Justice
 James Blevins
 Bradford Justice
 Jada Hunter
 W.C. Totten
 Jim Fletcher 
 Tag Keith 
 Don Gillman

School Anthem
The School Anthem of Burch High School was adapted from Sam Houston State University's "Alma Mater". It was most commonly played or sung at Burch High School class assemblies and sporting events.

"Hail to Burch High School, Hats off to you, 
Ever you'll find us, Loyal and true; 
Firm and undaunted, Ever we'll be. 
Here's to the school we love. 
Here's a toast to thee!"

Athletics
Burch High School earned five state basketball titles. 
Boys' Basketball - 1957(B), 1989(A), 1991(A), 1993(A)
Girls’ Basketball 1990 (A)

Boys' Coaches (unknown sport)

 Kenny Davis
 Homer Swan
 Charles Wrighter
 H. D. Fleming
 W. A. Collawn
 Ervin Bridgewater
 Troy Floyd
 Henry C. Justice
 Noah Maynard

Baseball 
The first Burch baseball team was formed in 1952 by Coach Jake Maynard. The team lasted till 1957, then went through a 19-year period with no baseball team. The team returned in 1976.

Boys' Baseball Coaches
 Jake Maynard, 1952
 Bill Young, 1953–1954
 Bud Hale, 1955
 Villis Stepp, 1956–1957
 Dick Montgomery, 1976
 Bill Smith, 1977–81
 Glen Stafford, 1982–91
 Calvin Curry (volunteer coach), 1992
 Don Spence, 1993–94
 Walt Catron, 1995–96, possibly until 1998
 Larry Carter, 1999–2011
 Hank Starr,  2011
 Thomas Hoffman, 2002–03
 David Hunt, 2004
 Larry Maynard (volunteer coach), 2005
 Thomas Hoffman, 2006
 Ed Randolph, 2007–08
 Butch Joplin, 2009–11

Basketball 
BHS won the first-ever basketball state title by a Mingo County high school in 1957 (Burch (27-1) 58, Barrackville (24-4) 54), under coach Bill Young. John Maynard, a future Burch head coach, played on that team under the old Class B division.

Burch then won the Class A title in 1989 (Burch (23-2) 70, Bishop Donahue (20-5) 61), with Coach John Maynard; then two more in 1991 (Burch (23-3) 67, Peterstown (25-1) 53), and in 1993 (Burch (24-3) 70, Doddridge Co. (14-12) 42), under Coach Mike Smith. On March 16, 2011, the Bulldogs played their final basketball game. Burch played its final home basketball game, on February 25, 2011 against Regional Christian School of Delbarton, WV.

State Basketball Titles 
Old Class "B" 
1957 (State Title) vs. Barrackville (58-54 FINAL)

Class "A" 
1989 (State Title) vs. Bishop Donahue (70-61 FINAL) 
1991 (State Title) vs. Peterstown (67-53 FINAL) 
1993 (State Title) vs. Doddridge County (70-42 FINAL)
1994 State Runner-Up ( Doddridge County ) 
1998 State Runner-Up ( Mullen’s )

Boys' Basketball Coaches
 L. T. Hulenbright (Only lost 1 game in 1922)
 Bill Young (Old Class B State Championship 1957)
 Charles Hale
 John W. Maynard (Class A State Championship 1989.)
 Mike Smith (Second best school record in 1982, 19 of 20 games. Class A State Championship 1991, 1993.)
 Kevin Hatfield

Boys' Junior High Basketball Coaches
 Rush Curry (Best junior high record, 26 straight games in 1946.)
 Villis Stepp

Girls' Basketball Coaches
 Sally Farley (Lost 1 game in 3 years.)
 Lucille McDonald
 Bill Smith (Won Burch's only girls state title in 1990)State Title 50-48 over Montcalm

Football

Boys' Football Coaches
 Mack Hall
 Phillip Sizemore
 Sidney Copley
 Mike    Smith
Doug Ward
 Dave hunt
 Edward Randolf
 Butch Joplin
 Walter Catron
 Jim Saunders 
Villis Stepp/Kenny Maynard-1961

References

Defunct schools in West Virginia
Educational institutions disestablished in 2011
Educational institutions established in 1921
Public high schools in West Virginia
Schools in Mingo County, West Virginia
1921 establishments in West Virginia
2011 disestablishments in West Virginia